Orphanage is an institution dedicated to the care of orphans.

Orphanage or The Orphanage may also refer to:

Film and video
 The Orphanage (company), California visual effects company founded in 1999
 The Orphanage (2007 film), Spanish horror drama directed by Juan Antonio Bayona
 The Orphanage of Iran, 2016 Iranian historical drama film directed by Abolqasem Talebi
 The Orphanage (2019 film), Danish-Afghan drama

Music
Orphanage, 1960s Irish band, featuring Phil Lynott and Brian Downey
Orphanage (band), Netherlands metal band founded in 1993
Orphanage, American rap group (List of Wu-Tang Clan affiliates#Orphanage)

Other
Orphanage Road in Birmingham, England